The Winds of Winter is the planned sixth novel in the epic fantasy series A Song of Ice and Fire by American writer George R. R. Martin. Martin believes the last two volumes of the series will total over 3,000 manuscript pages. Martin has refrained from making hard estimates for the novel's final release date after several delays. As of October 2022, he was still writing the manuscript, claiming to have written approximately three-quarters of it.

Plot 
Martin stated in a 2012 interview that The Winds of Winter and the following book A Dream of Spring will take readers farther north than any of the previous books, and the Others will appear in the book. The previous installment, A Dance with Dragons, covered less story than Martin intended, excluding at least one planned large battle sequence and leaving several character threads ending in cliffhangers. Martin intends to resolve these storylines "very early" in The Winds of Winter, saying "I'm going to open with the two big battles that I was building up to, the battle in the ice and the battle at Meereen — the battle of Slaver's Bay. And then take it from there." A Victarion Greyjoy chapter will begin five minutes after the end of A Dance with Dragons, taking place on the eve of the Ironborn's arrival in Slaver's Bay. Arianne Martell sample chapters that Martin released on his website showed her heading for Griffin's Roost to see the young man who is calling himself Aegon Targaryen. At Guadalajara International Book Fair 2016, Martin gave some clues about the dark nature of The Winds of Winter: ... "I've been telling you for 20 years that winter was coming. Winter is the time when things die, and cold and ice and darkness fill the world, so this is not going to be the happy feel-good that people may be hoping for. Some of the characters [are] in very dark places. .... Things get worse before they get better, so things are getting worse for a lot of people."

Viewpoint characters 
Martin has confirmed that the following characters have had point-of-view chapters in The Winds of Winter:
 Sansa Stark: One chapter was removed from A Dance with Dragons in June 2010, and one sample chapter titled Alayne appeared on Martin's website in April 2015.
 Arya Stark: One chapter was removed from A Dance with Dragons in June 2010, and one sample chapter titled Mercy appeared on Martin's website in March 2014.
 Arianne Martell: Two chapters were removed from A Dance with Dragons in June 2010. One sample chapter appeared on Martin's website in January 2013, and was read at Harbour Front Literaturfestival in June 2015. Martin read from both chapters at MystiCon in February 2016. In May 2016, Martin replaced the sample Sansa Stark chapter titled Alayne on his website from 2015 with the first Arianne Martell chapter he has read from at MystiCon.
 Aeron Greyjoy: One chapter was removed from A Dance with Dragons in July 2010. A chapter titled The Forsaken was read in May 2016 at Balticon. It was written in, or before, 2011 but there was no confirmation that this was the chapter removed from A Dance with Dragons.
 Theon Greyjoy: One sample chapter appeared on Martin's website in December 2011. It also appears as a teaser chapter at the end of the UK paperback edition of A Dance with Dragons (part two).
 Victarion Greyjoy: Portions of one chapter were first read at TIFF Bell Lightbox in March 2012.
 Tyrion Lannister: One chapter was read at Eastercon in April 2012, and another one at Worldcon in August 2013, the second of which was later published in the official iOS app on March 20, 2014.
 Barristan Selmy: One chapter was released as a teaser at the end of the 2013 U.S. paperback edition of A Dance with Dragons. In 2013, Martin read from a second chapter at Boskone.
 Cersei Lannister
 Jaime Lannister
 Brienne of Tarth
 Areo Hotah
Jon Connington
Bran Stark

Martin confirmed that some of these previously released chapters have been rewritten.

Martin confirmed that there are no new viewpoint characters intended for The Winds of Winter. He also stated that Samwell Tarly and Asha Greyjoy will appear in the novel, but did not elaborate if as viewpoint characters. He has also stated that non-viewpoint characters Lady Stoneheart, Quaithe, Euron Greyjoy and Rickon Stark will appear. He stated that Melisandre will return as viewpoint but did not state which novel her chapters will appear in. He teased at the 2014 San Diego Comic-Con that Jeyne Westerling, Robb Stark's widow, will appear in the prologue chapter, but did not reveal who will be the POV character.

Background and writing history

Structure 
The Winds of Winter was originally intended, in the very early stages of the series, to be the final installment of A Song of Ice and Fire (then conceived as a trilogy). Following his expansion of the series, Martin eventually concluded it would be succeeded by one final novel, A Dream of Spring.

Martin believes the last two volumes of the series will be massive works of more than 1,500 manuscript pages each. He does not intend to separate characters by geography again, as he was forced to do with A Feast for Crows because of the unpublishable length of that novel's original manuscript. But, as he stated in a 2011 interview, "Three years from now when I'm sitting on 1,800 pages of manuscript with no end in sight, who the hell knows". In 2018, he revealed that some of his publishers had suggested splitting The Winds of Winter into two books but that he was "resisting that notion".
In 2022, he stated that The Winds of Winter could be bigger than A Storm of Swords or A Dance with Dragons; The manuscript for A Storm of Swords had 1521 pages and the manuscript for A Dance with Dragons exceeded 1,600 pages before trimming.

Chapters 
By June 2010, Martin had finished four chapters for The Winds of Winter from the viewpoints of Sansa Stark, Arya Stark, and Arianne Martell. In July 2010, he added an Aeron Greyjoy chapter that had been moved from A Dance with Dragons to The Winds of Winter, accumulating around 100 completed manuscript pages. Following the publication of A Dance with Dragons in July 2011, Martin announced his return to writing the series in January 2012, having spent the intervening time on his U.S. and overseas book publicity tours and attending various conventions.

In December 2011, Martin posted a Theon Greyjoy viewpoint chapter from The Winds of Winter; he also announced that another sample chapter would be included at the end of the North American paperback version of A Dance with Dragons, which was originally expected to be released in mid-2012, but was released on October 29, 2013. (International paperback editions of A Dance with Dragons published a year earlier did not include a new, as yet unpublished sample chapter.) In the first quarter of 2012, Martin read new chapters of other characters at public events, including the chapters of Victarion Greyjoy and Tyrion Lannister. Martin continued work editing anthologies and completing a large, highly detailed series atlas The Lands of Ice and Fire, which was published in October 2012. Martin published another sample chapter from Arianne Martell's POV on his website in January 2013. On March 27, ten days before the Game of Thrones season four premiere, Martin posted a chapter on his website, titled Mercy. Martin said the new chapter is actually an old one, though never published nor publicly read. In April 2015, Martin posted a Sansa Stark viewpoint chapter from The Winds of Winter titled Alayne. In May 2016, Martin replaced this chapter with an Arianne Martell chapter he had read from at Mysticon, and an Aeron Greyjoy chapter that was removed from A Dance with Dragons was read at Balticon.

As of June 2016, a total of 11 chapters from The Winds of Winter had been either read publicly or published as a sample chapter. The point of view characters with released material are Victarion, Aeron, Tyrion, Barristan, Arianne, Theon, Mercy (Arya), and Alayne (Sansa). Several websites, including Goodreads, have dedicated entire discussion panels to any material that has been released from The Winds of Winter, including plot twists, theories, and speculations. In 2018, Martin indicated he would not release any more sample chapters. In 2020, Martin indicated he had been revising some of the sample chapters.

Writing history 
In April 2011, shortly before the publication of A Dance with Dragons, which took him six years to write, Martin hoped that "the last two books will go a little quicker than this one has" and estimated that it would take "three years to finish the next one at a good pace".  In a July 2011 interview, Martin acknowledged that his repeated estimating of publication dates that were not subsequently met had angered some of his fan base in the past, and at the time suggested he would not make them going forward.

By October 2012, 400 pages of the sixth novel had been written, although Martin considered only the first 200 as "really finished", the rest still needing revisions. 

In April 2013, Martin estimated that he had a quarter of the book.

In April 2015, Martin said he would like to have it published before the sixth season of the HBO series Game of Thrones (which was to cover material from the book) aired in 2016; in September 2015, statements made by the Spanish editor and the Polish translator of the novel indicated that it was expected to be published in 2016.

In January 2016, Martin confirmed that he had not met an end-of-year deadline that he had established with his publisher for release of the book before the sixth season of the HBO show. He added that completion of the book was "months away still... if the writing goes well". Martin also revealed there had been a previous deadline of October 2015 that he had considered achievable in May 2015, and that in September 2015 he had still considered the end-of-year deadline achievable. He confirmed that some of the plot of the book might be revealed on the show Game of Thrones but one of the showrunners, David Benioff, claimed that while certain key elements would be the same, the show would diverge from the book in many respects. In February 2016, Martin stated that he had dropped all his editing projects except for Wild Cards, and that he would not be writing anything before delivering The Winds of Winter.

In 2017, Martin believed that The Winds of Winter would be released that same year. However, he also noted that he had believed the same thing would occur the previous year, and later that year he confirmed he was "still months away" from finishing the book, indicating it may not be published until 2018 or later, with Fire & Blood, the book on the history of House Targaryen, possibly preceding it. 
In April 2018, Martin confirmed that Fire & Blood would be published before The Winds of Winter, which would not be published in 2018; he indicated that Fire & Blood was the book his publisher wanted next. Since then, he has confirmed at least four times in 2018 that he was continuing work on The Winds of Winter. In April 2019, Martin said that the writing "has been going very well lately", and in May he wrote that if he did not have a copy of The Winds of Winter in hand for 2020 Worldcon New Zealand, Air New Zealand has his permission to imprison him on New Zealand's White Island until he finishes it. In October 2019, Martin said he hoped to finish The Winds of Winter "in the relatively near future", and after a Game of Thrones prequel, House of the Dragon, of which Martin is one of the executive producers, was announced, he stated that there was a lot of work to be done on the series but that he would not write any scripts for the series before finishing The Winds of Winter.

In an interview published in January 2020, Martin said that while he was still working on The Winds of Winter, his primary focus, he also continues working with Nnedi Okorafor on a TV adaptation of her science fantasy novel Who Fears Death, for which he agreed to be executive producer in 2017. In March and April 2020, Martin stated that he was writing The Winds of Winter every day. In February 2021, Martin said he had written "hundreds and hundreds of pages" of The Winds of Winter in 2020 but that even though it had been the most productive year with regard to The Winds of Winter, he still had hundreds of pages to write; although he was hopeful of finishing in 2021, he did not want to make any predictions. In March 2022, Martin stated that he had made less progress in 2021 than in 2020, but emphasized that less' is not 'none.

During an appearance on the October 25, 2022, episode of The Late Show with Stephen Colbert, Martin said that approximately three quarters of The Winds of Winter had been written.

References

External links 
  of author George R. R. Martin

A Song of Ice and Fire books
American fantasy novels
Bantam Spectra books
Novels by George R. R. Martin
Unpublished novels
Upcoming books